This page is a list of High Sheriffs of Glamorgan. Sheriffs of Glamorgan served under and were answerable to the independent Lords of Glamorgan until that lordship was merged into the crown. This is in contrast to sheriffs of the English shires who were from the earliest times officers of the crown. Sheriffs in the modern sense, appointed and answerable to the crown, were instituted in the county of Glamorgan in 1541.

On 1 April 1974 the shrievalty of Glamorgan was abolished and replaced by the High Sheriff of West Glamorgan, the High Sheriff of Mid Glamorgan and the High Sheriff of South Glamorgan.

List of Sheriffs

1122–1149 Sir Robert Norreis
1322 Sir Henry de Wylyngton Barony of Willington of Keir Kenny (Carreg Cennen Castle)
1421 Sir John Stradling

16th century

17th century

18th century

19th Century

20th Century

References

 List of Sheriffs

 
Glamorgan
Glamorgan